The 2011 South American Under-15 Football Championship was the 5th U-15 tournament for national teams affiliated with CONMEBOL. It was held in Uruguay from 17 November to 4 December 2011.

Brazil was the winning champion.

Teams

 

 
 (holders)

 (hosts)

Venues
Three stadiums in three host cities were chosen for the tournament:

Draw
The draw of the first stage groups was held on 17 March 2011 during the CONMEBOL Executive Committee meeting at the CONMEBOL headquarters in Asunción, Paraguay.

Officials
On 20 October 2011, CONMEBOL's Commission on Referees announced the list of 10 referees and assistant to be used for the tournament.

Officials
 Patricio Loustau
 Jorge Mansilla
 Sandro Ricci
 Eduardo Gamboa
 Adrián Vélez
 José Luis Espinel
 Enrique Cáceres
 Henry Gambetta
 Daniel Fedorczuk
 José Argote

Assistants
 Juan Pablo Belatti
 Wilson Arellano
 Marcelo Van Gasse
 Marcelo Barraza
 Alexander Guzmán
 Douglas Espinoza
 Hugo Martínez
 Raúl López Cruz
 Nicolás Tarán
 Carlos López

First round
The 10 national teams were divided in 2 groups of 5 teams each. The top 2 teams in each group qualified for the final round.

Group A

Group B

Final round
The final round was played in a round robin system between the four best teams.

References

External links
CONMEBOL official website

Under
South
2011
South American Under-15 Football Championship
2011 in youth association football